This is the Marine Infantry section of the Military ranks of the Colombian Armed Forces.
In Colombia, the Marine Infantry is a part of the Colombian Navy and not a full service branch on its own. Being tasked with amphibious and riverine and littoral operations, the MI presents a somewhat odd combination of ranking names derived from the Army, combined with naval insignias.

The tables below display the rank structures and rank insignias for the Colombian Marine Infantry personnel.

Officers

{|class="wikitable collapsible" style="min-width:50%;width:99% "
|-
!
!colspan="12" style="font-weight:bold; font-size:1.2em;text-align:center; "|Ranks and Insignias - Colombian Marine Infantry
|-

|- style="background-color:#CCCCCC; font-weight:bold;" align="center"
  |style="white-space:nowrap;"|NATO code ||OF-10||OF-9||OF-8||OF-7||OF-6||OF-5||OF-4||OF-3||OF-2</td>OF-1
|- align="center"
  |
  |No equivalent
  |
  |
  |
  |
  |
  |
  |
  |
  |
  |
|- align="center"
  | 
  | -
  |General
  |Teniente General
  |General|Mayor General
  |Brigadier
  |Coronel
  |Teniente Coronel
  |Mayor
  |Capitán
  |Teniente
  |Subteniente
|- align="center"
  |Abbr.|| - ||GR||TG||MG||BG||CR||TC||MY||CT||TE||ST
|- align="center"
  |  || -||General ||Lieutenant General ||Major General ||Brigadier General ||Colonel ||Lieutenant Colonel
  |Major ||Captain ||Lieutenant ||Second Lieutenant
|}

Non-Commissioned Officers and Infantrymen

See also
 Military ranks of the Colombian Armed Forces
 Colombian Marine Infantry

Notes

References

External links
 Comando de Infantería de Marina, Armada Nacional de Colombia (official site)

Military ranks of Colombia